Deep diving is underwater diving to a depth beyond the norm accepted by the associated community. In some cases this is a prescribed limit established by an authority, while in others it is associated with a level of certification or training, and it may vary depending on whether the diving is recreational, technical or commercial. Nitrogen narcosis becomes a hazard below  and hypoxic breathing gas is required below  to lessen the risk of oxygen toxicity.

In technical diving, a depth below about  where hypoxic breathing gas becomes necessary to avoid oxygen toxicity may be considered a deep dive. In professional diving, a depth that requires special equipment, procedures, or advanced training may be considered a deep dive.

Deep diving can mean something else in the commercial diving field. For instance early experiments carried out by Comex S.A. (Compagnie maritime d'expertises) using hydrox and trimix attained far greater depths than any recreational technical diving. These divers needed to breathe special gas mixtures because they were exposed to very high ambient pressure (more than 50 times atmospheric pressure).

These suits are capable of withstanding the pressure at great depth permitting the diver to remain at normal atmospheric pressure. This eliminates the problems associated with breathing high-pressure gases.

Depth ranges in underwater diving
Assumed is the surface of the waterbody to be at or near sea level and underlies atmospheric pressure.

Not included are the differing ranges of freediving - without breathing during a dive.

Particular problems associated with deep dives
Deep diving has more hazards and greater risk than basic open water diving. Nitrogen narcosis, the "narks" or "rapture of the deep", starts with feelings of euphoria and over-confidence but then leads to numbness and memory impairment similar to alcohol intoxication. Decompression sickness, or the "bends", can happen if a diver ascends too rapidly, when excess inert gas leaves solution in the blood and tissues and forms bubbles. These bubbles produce mechanical and biochemical effects that lead to the condition. The onset of symptoms depends on the severity of the tissue gas loading and may develop during ascent in severe cases, but is frequently delayed until after reaching the surface. Bone degeneration (dysbaric osteonecrosis) is caused by the bubbles forming inside the bones; most commonly the upper arm and the thighs. Deep diving involves a much greater danger of all of these, and presents the additional risk of oxygen toxicity, which may lead to a convulsion underwater. Very deep diving using a helium-oxygen mixture (heliox) carries a risk of high-pressure nervous syndrome. Coping with the physical and physiological stresses of deep diving requires good physical conditioning.

Heavy physical exertion makes the diver breathe even more gas, and gas becomes denser requiring increased effort to breathe with depth, leading to increased risk of hypercapnia—an excess of carbon dioxide in the blood. The need to do decompression stops increases with depth. A diver at  may be able to dive for many hours without needing to do decompression stops. In the event of an emergency, the diver cannot make an immediate ascent to the surface without risking decompression sickness. All of these considerations result in the amount of breathing gas required for deep diving being much greater than for shallow open water diving. The diver needs a disciplined approach to planning and conducting dives to minimise these additional risks.

Many of these problems are avoided by the use of surface supplied breathing gas, closed diving bells, and saturation diving, at the cost of logistical complexity, reduced maneuverability of the diver, and greater expense.

Dealing with depth

Both equipment and procedures can be adapted to deal with the problems of greater depth. Usually the two are combined, as the procedures must be adapted to suit the equipment, and in some cases the equipment is needed to facilitate the procedures.

Equipment adaptations for deeper diving
The equipment used for deep diving depends on both the depth and the type of diving. Scuba is limited to equipment that can be carried by the diver or is easily deployed by the dive team, while surface-supplied diving equipment can be more extensive, and much of it stays above the water where it is operated by the diving support team.
 Scuba divers carry larger volumes of breathing gas to compensate for the increased gas consumption and decompression stops.
 Though more complex, rebreathers manage gas much more efficiently than open-circuit scuba.
 Use of helium-based breathing gases such as trimix reduces nitrogen narcosis and reduces the toxic effects of oxygen at depth.
 A diving shot, a decompression trapeze or a decompression buoy can help divers control their ascent and return to the surface at a position that can be monitored by their surface support team at the end of a dive.
 Decompression can be accelerated by using specially blended breathing gas mixtures containing lower proportions of inert gas.
 Surface supply of breathing gases reduces the risk of running out of gas.
 In-water decompression can be minimized by using dry bells and decompression chambers.
 Hot-water suits can prevent hypothermia due to the high heat loss when using helium-based breathing gases.
 Diving bells and  submersibles expose the diver to the direct underwater environment for less time, and provide a relatively safe shelter that does not require decompression, with a dry environment where the diver can rest, take refreshment, and if necessary, receive first aid in an emergency.
 Breathing gas s reduce the cost of using helium-based breathing gases, by recovering and recycling exhaled surface supplied gas, analogous to rebreathers for scuba diving.
 The most radical equipment adaptation for deep diving is to isolate the diver from the direct pressure of the environment, using armoured atmospheric diving suits that allow diving to depths beyond those currently possible at ambient pressure. These rigid, articulated exoskeleton suits are sealed against water and withstand external pressure while providing life support to the diver for several hours at an internal pressure of approximately normal surface atmospheric pressure. This avoids the problems of inert gas narcosis, decompression sickness, barotrauma, oxygen toxicity, high work of breathing, compression arthralgia, high-pressure nervous syndrome and hypothermia, but at the cost of reduced mobility and dexterity, logistical problems due to the bulk and mass of the suits, and high equipment costs.

Procedural adaptations for deeper diving
Procedural adaptations for deep diving can be classified as those procedures for operating specialized equipment, and those that apply directly to the problems caused by exposure to high ambient pressures.
 The most important procedure for dealing with physiological problems of breathing at high ambient pressures associated with deep diving is decompression. This is necessary to prevent inert gas bubble formation in the body tissues of the diver, which can cause severe injury. Decompression procedures have been derived for a large range of pressure exposures, using a large range of gas mixtures. These basically entail a slow and controlled reduction in pressure during ascent by using a restricted ascent rate and decompression stops, so that the inert gases dissolved in the tissues of the diver can be eliminated harmlessly during normal respiration. 
 Gas management procedures are necessary to ensure that the diver has access to suitable and sufficient breathing gas at all times during the dive, both for the planned dive profile and for any reasonably foreseeable contingency. Scuba gas management is logistically more complex than surface supply, as the diver must either carry all the gas, must follow a route where previously arranged gas supply depots have been set up (stage cylinders). or must rely on a team of support divers who will provide additional gas at pre-arranged signals or points on the planned dive. On very deep scuba dives or on occasions where long decompression times are planned, it is a common practice for support divers to meet the primary team at decompression stops to check if they need assistance, and these support divers will often carry extra gas supplies in case of need. The use of rebreathers can reduce the bulk of the gas supplies for long and deep scuba dives, at the cost of more complex equipment with more potential failure modes, requiring more complex procedures and higher procedural task loading.
 Surface supplied diving distributes the task loading between the divers and the support team, who remain in the relative safety and comfort of the surface control position. Gas supplies are limited only by what is available at the control position, and the diver only needs to carry sufficient bailout capacity to reach the nearest place of safety, which may be a diving bell or lockout submersible.
 Saturation diving is a procedure used to reduce the high-risk decompression a diver is exposed to during a long series of deep underwater exposures. By keeping the diver under high pressure for the whole job, and only decompressing at the end of several days to weeks of underwater work, a single decompression can be done at a slower rate without adding much overall time to the job. During the saturation period, the diver lives in a pressurized environment at the surface, and is transported under pressure to the underwater work site in a closed diving bell.

Ultra-deep diving
Amongst technical divers, there are divers who participate in ultra-deep diving on scuba below . This practice requires high levels of training, experience, discipline, fitness and surface support. The Holy Grail of deep scuba diving was the  mark, first achieved by John Bennett in 2001, and has only been achieved seven times since.

The difficulties involved in ultra-deep diving are numerous. Although commercial and military divers often operate at those depths, or even deeper, they are surface supplied. All of the complexities of ultra-deep diving are magnified by the requirement of the diver to carry (or provide for) their own gas underwater. These lead to rapid descents and "bounce dives". Unsurprisingly, this has led to extremely high mortality rates amongst those who practise ultra-deep diving. Notable ultra-deep diving fatalities include Sheck Exley, John Bennett, Dave Shaw and Guy Garman. Mark Ellyatt, Don Shirley and Pascal Bernabé were involved in serious incidents and were fortunate to survive their dives. Despite the extremely high mortality rate, the Guinness Book of World Records continues to maintain a record for scuba diving (although in deference to the death rate it has stopped recording the record for deep diving on air). Amongst those who do survive significant health issues are reported. Mark Ellyatt is reported to have suffered permanent lung damage; Pascal Bernabé (who was injured on his dive when a light on his mask imploded) and Nuno Gomes reported short to medium term hearing loss.

Serious issues that confront divers engaging in ultra-deep diving on self-contained breathing apparatus include:
 High-pressure nervous syndrome (HPNS) HPNS, brought on by breathing helium under extreme pressure causes tremors, myoclonic jerking, somnolence, EEG changes, visual disturbance, nausea, dizziness, and decreased mental performance. Symptoms of HPNS are exacerbated by rapid compression, a feature common to ultra-deep "bounce" dives.
 Decompression algorithm There are no reliable decompression algorithms tested for such depths on the assumption of an immediate surfacing. Almost all decompression methodology for such depths is based upon saturation, and calculates ascent times in days rather than hours. Accordingly, ultra-deep dives are almost always a partly experimental basis.

In addition, "ordinary" risks like gas reserves, hypothermia, dehydration and oxygen toxicity are compounded by extreme depth and exposure. Much technical equipment is simply not designed for the necessarily greater stresses at depths, and reports of key equipment (including submersible pressure gauges) imploding are not uncommon.

Ultra deep air
A severe risk in ultra-deep air diving is deep water blackout, or depth blackout, a loss of consciousness at depths below 50 m with no clear primary cause, associated with nitrogen narcosis, a neurological impairment with anaesthetic effects caused by high partial pressure of nitrogen dissolved in nerve tissue, and possibly acute oxygen toxicity. The term is not in widespread use at present, as where the actual cause of blackout is known, a more specific term is preferred. The depth at which deep water blackout occurs is extremely variable and unpredictable. Before the popular availability of Trimix, attempts were made to set world record depths using air. The extreme risk of both narcosis and oxygen toxicity in the divers contributed to a high fatality rate in those attempting records. In his book, Deep Diving, Bret Gilliam chronicles the various fatal attempts to set records as well as the smaller number of successes. From the comparatively few who survived extremely deep air dives:
 1957—Eduard Admetlla i Lázaro descended to 100 meters on air.
Only two of the above-mentioned three divers managed to reach 131m with compressed air in a certified way: Novelli, the organizer of the event and inventor of the regulator, forgot to punch the plate for proving the descent.
 1965—Tom Mount and Frank Martz dive to a depth of 360 feet sea water (fsw) on air
Watson reported that he had no recollection at all of what transpired at the bottom of the descent due to narcosis.
Exley almost made it to the divers, but was forced to turn back due to heavy narcosis and nearly blacking out.
 1990—Bret Gilliam dived to a depth of 452 fsw on air. Unusually, Gilliam remained largely functional at depth and was able to complete basic maths problems and answer simple questions written on a slate by his crew beforehand.
 1993—Bret Gilliam extended his own world record to 475 fsw, again reporting no ill effects from narcosis or oxygen toxicity.
Manion reported he was almost completely incapacitated by narcosis and has no recollection of time at depth.
In deference to the high death rate, the Guinness World Records ceased to publish records on deep air dives in mid-2005.

Fatalities during depth record attempts
 Maurice Fargues died in 1947 in an experiment to see how deep a scuba diver could go. He reached 120 m before failing to return line signals.
 Hope Root died December 1953 trying to break the deep diving record of 330 feet; he was last seen passing 625 feet.
 Archie Forfar and Anne Gunderson died on 11 December 1971 off the coast of Andros Island, Bahamas, while attempting to dive to 480 feet, which would have been the world record at the time. Their third team member, Jim Lockwood, only survived due to his use of a safety weight that dropped when he lost consciousness, causing him to start an uncontrolled ascent before being intercepted by a safety diver at a depth of around 300 feet. As mentioned above, Sheck Exley, who was acting as another safety diver at 300 feet, inadvertently managed to set the depth record when he descended towards Forfar and Gunderson, who were both still alive at the 480-foot level, although completely incapacitated by narcosis. Exley was forced to give up his attempt at around 465 feet deep when the narcosis very nearly overcame him as well. The bodies of Forfar and Gunderson were never recovered.
 Sheck Exley died in 1994 in an attempt to reach the bottom of Zacatón in a dive that would have extended his own world record (at the time) for deep diving.
 Dave Shaw died in 2005 in an attempt at the deepest ever body recovery and deepest ever dive on a rebreather.
Brigitte Lenoir, planning to attempt the deepest dive ever made by a woman, died in 2010 in Dahab (Egypt) during a training dive.
The Virgin Island Police Department confirmed that Dr. Guy Garman's body was recovered on 18 August 2015.
 Theodora Balabanova died at Toroneos Bay, Greece, on 27 September 2017 attempting to beat the women's deep dive record. She did not complete the decompression stops and surfaced too early.
 Waclaw Lejko attempting 275 m / 902 ft in Lake Garda, died on 27 September 2017. His body was recovered with a ROV at 230 m / 754 ft.
 Adam Krzysztof Pawlik, attempting a 316 m dive in Lake Garda, died on 18 October 2018. His body was located at 284 meters.
 Sebastian Marczewski, attempting a 333 m dive in Lake Garda, reached the target depth of 333 m but his tanks became entangled in his ascent line at 150 m. He died on 6 July 2019.

See also

References

Footnotes

Further reading

External links
Recreational Deep Diving

Underwater diving procedures